Danjibong (단지봉 / 丹芝峯) is a mountain of Gyeongsangnam-do, southeastern South Korea.

See also
List of mountains of Korea

References

Mountains of South Korea
Mountains of South Gyeongsang Province
One-thousanders of South Korea